Graham Goulden (or Goulder) Hough (14 February 1908 – 5 September 1990) was an English literary critic, poet, and Professor of English at Cambridge University from 1966 to 1975.

Life
Graham Hough was born in Great Crosby, Lancashire, the son of Joseph and Clara Hough. He was educated at Prescot Grammar School, the University of Liverpool and Queens' College, Cambridge. He became a lecturer in English at Raffles College, Singapore, in 1930. In World War II he served as a volunteer with the Singapore Royal Artillery, until taken prisoner and interned in a Japanese prison-camp. After further travelling and teaching in the Far East, Hough returned to Cambridge as a fellow of Christ's College in 1950. He was Tutor at Christ's from 1955 to 1960. In 1958 he was Visiting Professor at Cornell University. From 1964 to 1975 he was Praelector and Fellow of Darwin College. University Reader in English from  1965 to 1966, he was Professor of English at the university from 1966 to 1975.

He died in Cambridge on 5 September 1990.

Works
 The Last Romantics, 1949
 The Romantic Poets, 1953
 The Dark Sun: a study of D. H. Lawrence, 1956
 Image and Experience: Studies in a Literary Revolution, 1960
 Legends and Pastorals, 1961
 A Preface to the Faerie Queene, 1962
 The Dream and the Task: Literature and Morals in the Culture of Today, 1963
 An Essay on Criticism, 1966
 Style and Stylistics, 1969
 Selected Essays, 1978
 The Mystery Religion of W. B. Yeats, 1984

References

External links

1908 births
1990 deaths
English literary critics
Fellows of Christ's College, Cambridge
Fellows of Darwin College, Cambridge
Alumni of Queens' College, Cambridge
20th-century English poets
People educated at Prescot Grammar School